KDJR (100.1 FM) is a non-profit Christian radio station broadcasting a Religious music format. Licensed to De Soto, Missouri, United States. The station is currently owned by Family Worship Center Church.

References

External links
http://sonlifetv.com

DJR
Radio stations established in 1974